Ye, Je, or Ie (Е е; italics: Е е) is a letter of the Cyrillic script. It was derived from the Greek letter epsilon (Ε ε), and the shape is very similar to the latin letter E or another version of E (Cyrillic).

Ye is romanized using the Latin letter E for Bulgarian, Serbian, Macedonian, Ukrainian and Rusyn, and occasionally Russian (Озеро Байкал, Ozero Baykal), Je for Belarusian (Заслаўе, Zaslaŭje), Ye for Russian (Европа, Yevropa), and Ie occasionally for Russian (Днепр, Dniepr) and Belarusian (Маладзе́чна, Maladziečna).

Usage

Russian and Belarusian
Ukrainian uses the letter  (see Ukrainian Ye) in this way.

In these cases,  may be used, see Yo (Cyrillic). In unstressed syllables,  represents reduced vowels like , see Russian phonology and Vowel reduction in Russian.

Bulgarian, Serbian, Macedonian, Ukrainian and Rusyn

Mongolian 

Turkic languages and Tajik
In Turkic languages utilizing the Cyrillic script (such as Kazakh, Kyrgyz and Uzbek) and in Tajik, Ye is used to represent the phoneme ~, both word-finally and medially. Isolated, word-initially, or vowel-succeeding, this letter is substituted with the letter Э. If the letter Ye occurs word-initially, isolated, or vowel-succeeding, it represents the phoneme /je/~/jɛ/.

Computing codes

External links

Vowel letters